The men's 81 kg competition in judo at the 2022 Mediterranean Games was held on 30 June at the Mohammed Ben Ahmed Convention Centre in Oran.

Results

Main bracket

Repechage

References

External links
 

M81
2022